Geocomputation (sometimes GeoComputation) is a field of study at the intersection of geography and computation.

See also
Geoinformatics
Geomathematics
Geographic information system

Bibliography
 Openshaw, S., and R. J. Abrahart. (1996). “Geocomputation.” In Proceedings of the 1st International Conference on GeoComputation, 665–6, edited by R. J. Abrahart. Leeds, U.K.: University of Leeds

 Longley, P. A., S. M. Brooks, R. McDonnell, and W. D. Macmillan. (1998). Geocomputation: A Primer. Chichester, U.K.: John Wiley & Sons

 Gahegan, M. (1999). “Guest Editorial: What is Geocomputation?” Transactions in GIS 3(3), 203–6.

 Brunsdon, C., and A. D. Singleton. (2015). Geocomputation: A Practical Primer. London: Sage

 Harris, R., D. O’Sullivan, M. Gahegan, M. Charlton, L. Comber, P. Longley, C. Brunsdon, N. Malleson, A. Heppenstall, A. Singleton, D. Arribas-Bel, and A. Evans. (2017). “More Bark than Bytes? Reflections on 21+ Years of Geocomputation.” Environment and Planning B 44(4), 598–617.

Geographic data and information fields of study
Computational fields of study